Richard B. Gartner (born in New York City ca. 1947) is a clinical psychologist who was trained both as a family therapist and an interpersonal psychoanalyst. One of the founders of MaleSurvivor: the National Organization on Male Sexual Victimization [www.malesurvivor.org], he is a Past President of the organization and now chairs its advisory board. He is known for his research and clinical work in the area of child sexual abuse against boys and its aftermath for them as men.

Career 
Richard Gartner is a graduate of the William Alanson White Institute for Psychiatry, Psychoanalysis, and Psychiatry (wawhite.org) in New York City, founded its Sexual Abuse Service and served as the Service's director from 1994 to 2005. He is also a training and supervising analyst and on the faculty of the White Institute.

He is also known as the author of the books Betrayed as Boys: Psychodynamic Treatment of Sexually Abused Men (1999, 2001)and Beyond Betrayal: Taking Charge of Your Life after Boyhood Sexual Abuse (2005) and as the editor of Understanding the Sexual Betrayal of Boys and Men: The Trauma of Sexual Abuse (2018), Healing Sexually Betrayed Men and Boys: Treatment for Sexual Abuse, Assault, and Trauma, "Trauma and Countertrauma, Resilience and Counterresilience: Insights from Psychoanalysts and Trauma Experts" (2017), and Memories of Sexual Betrayal: Truth, Fantasy, Repression, and Dissociation (1997).  Betrayed as Boys was Runner-up for the 2001 Gradiva Award for Best Book on a Clinical Subject given by the National Association for the Advancement of Psychoanalysis (NAAP) and was translated into Japanese language in 2005 under the title Shōnen e no Seiteki Gyakutai: Danseihigaisha no Shintekigaishō to Seishinbunseki Chiryō.

He has spoken in numerous venues about male sexual victimization, including the American Psychological and Psychiatric Associations; the Harvard University Medical School; the Sandor Ferenczi Society in Budapest; the Federal Bureau of Investigation; and various universities, rape intervention programs, and hospitals throughout the United States and in Canada, South Arica, Australia, China, Hungary, Israel, and Iran. In 2002 after the Catholic sex abuse cases were revealed, USA Today sought him to comment about sexual abuse against males. Interviews with him have also appeared in such print outlets as the New York Times, Associated Press, Los Angeles Times, Washington Post, London Times, USA Today, The Nation, and New York Newsday. In addition, he has been featured on CNN, CBS, NPR, Fox News, NBC News Channel, MSNBC, and ABC.com, among others, and on radio stations in the United States, Canada, Australia, and South Africa. He was the subject of a 2005 full-length interview, “A Conversation With Richard Gartner--Beyond Betrayal: Men Cope With Being the Victims,” in the Science Times of the New York Times.

Education 
Dr. Gartner received his bachelor's degree in psychology from Haverford College in 1967. He went on to receive his MS ('71) and Ph.D. ('72) in clinical psychology, both from Columbia University.

Works 

BOOKS
 Understanding the Sexual Betrayal of Boys and Men: The Trauma of Sexual Abuse (2018).
 Healing Sexually Abused Men and Boys: Treatment for Sexual Abuse, Assault, and Trauma (2018).
 Trauma and Countertrauma, Resilience and Counterresilience: Insights from Psychoanalysts and Trauma Experts  (2017).  , 
Beyond Betrayal: Taking Charge of Your Life after Boyhood Sexual Abuse (2005) 
Betrayed as Boys: Psychodynamic Treatment of Sexually Abused Men (1999, 2001) 
Memories of Sexual Betrayal: Truth, Fantasy, Repression, and Dissociation (1997) 

ARTICLES
 Dissociation and Counterdissociation: Nuanced and Binary Perceptions of Good and Evil (2018). Contemporary Psychoanalysis
 Altered (Self) States: A Meditation on “Exploring Dissociation and Dissociative Identity Disorder” (2015).  Psychoanalytic Perspectives, 12:1, 84-86
 Trauma and countertrauma, resilience and counterresilience (2014).  Contemporary Psychoanalysis, 50:609–626
 Failed "Fathers," boys betrayed' (2007).  Chapter in Predatory Priests, Silenced Victims, M.G. Frawley-O’Dea and V. Goldner, Eds. 
 The Jewish men dancing inside me' (2007).  Chapter in The Still Small Voice, M Holzman, Ed.  
 Predatory priests: Sexually abusing Fathers (2004).  Studies in Gender and Sexuality, 5:31-56
 Coming to terms with sexual abuse (2002).  Psychologist-Psychoanalyst, 22:18.
 Effects on boys of priest abuse (2002).  Psychologist-Psychoanalyst, 22:15-17
 Relational aftereffects in manhood of boyhood sexual abuse (1999). Journal of Contemporary Psychotherapy, 29:319-353. 
 On masculine strength, emotional detachment, and the praise of incest (1999). Gender and Psychoanalysis, 4: 307–316.
 Cinematic depictions of boyhood sexual victimization (1999). Gender and Psychoanalysis, 4:253-289.
 Sexual victimization of boys by men: Meanings and consequences (1999).  Journal of Gay and Lesbian Psychotherapy, 3:1-33.
 Memories of sexual betrayal: Psychoanalytic perspectives on the debate (1997). Round Robin, Winter, 1997: 4–5, 16.
 Considerations in the psychoanalytic treatment of men who were sexually abused as children (1997).  Psychoanalytic Psychology, 14:13-41.  Originally presented at April, 1993, meeting of Division 39 (Psychoanalysis) of the American Psychological     Association, New York, and the July, 1993, International Conference of the Sandor Ferencz Society, Budapest
 Managing chronic loss and grief: Contrapuntal needs of an AIDS patient and his therapist (1997).  Chapter in Hope and Mortality: Psychodynamic Approaches to AIDS and HIV, M. Blechner, Ed. 
 An analytic group for sexually abused men (1997), International Journal of Group Psychotherapy, 47:373-383.  Originally presented as 'Identifications and transferences in analytic group therapy for sexually abused men' at April, 1995 meeting of Division 39 (Psychoanalysis) of the American Psychological Association, Santa Monica
 Incestuous boundary violations in families of borderline patients (1996). Contemporary Psychoanalysis, 32:73-80.  Originally presented at April, 1992, meeting of Division 39 (Psychoanalysis) of the American Psychological Association, Philadelphia
 The relationship between Interpersonal Psychoanalysis and Family Therapy (1995).  Chapter in Handbook of Interpersonal Psychoanalysis, M. Lionells, J. Fiscalini, C. Mann, and D. Stern, Eds. 
(with Bass, A., and Wolbert, S.) 'The use of the one-way mirror in restructuring family boundaries (1979), Family Therapy, 6:27-37
 (with Fulmer, R.H., Weinshel, M., and Goldklank, S.)  The family life cycle: Developmental crises and their structural impact on families in a community mental health center (1978), Family Process, 17:47-58

OP EDs
A Troubled Silence. NY Times op-ed column, print edition, June 8, 2012, p. A27 (https://www.nytimes.com/2012/06/08/opinion/in-light-of-child-abuse.html?_r=1&emc=eta1)
Abuse victims need time to seek justice: Syracuse case highlights shortcomings in law.  NY Daily News op-ed column, print edition, December 18, 2011 (http://articles.nydailynews.com/2011-12-18/news/30532426_1_sexual-abuse-statute-of-limitations-laws-predators)
NY must give child sex abuse victims more time. NY Newsday op-ed column, print edition, April 23, 2009 (https://groups.google.com/forum/#!topic/sci.psychology.theory/33_YcP9T4W0)

OPINION PAPERS 
US Troops Ordered to Turn a Blind Eye to Child Rape By Afghani Troops, Good Men Project, Sept 27, 2015  (http://goodmenproject.com/featured-content/child-rape-in-afghanistan-megaahd#sthash.QNTJUQ9Y.dpuf))
The Penn State NCAA Penalties: What About The Boys? Reprinted in blog by Todd Essig, Forbes.com, July 23 ‘12. (https://www.forbes.com/sites/toddessig/2012/07/23/the-penn-state-ncaa-penalties-what-about-the-boys/)
MaleSurvivor Urges Brooklyn DA Hynes, Ultra-Orthodox Community to Protect Survivors of Abuse, MaleSurvivor Press Release, May 21 ’12 (http://www.pr.com/press-release/414456)
MaleSurvivor Responds to Reports That in 1998 Sandusky Labeled "Likely Pedophile," MaleSurvivor Press Release, March 28 ’12 (http://www.pr.com/press-release/401424)
MaleSurvivor Calls on the Boy Scouts of America to Publicly Acknowledge the Mistakes of Its Past and Commit to Establishing Clear Standards for Reporting Sexual Assault, MaleSurvivor Press Release, Feb 27 ’12 (http://www.pr.com/press-release/393898)
Caring For Survivors of Boyhood Sexual Abuse Is The Next Step In The Penn State Case. Forbes.com, Nov 18, 2011. (https://www.forbes.com/sites/toddessig/2011/11/18/caring-for-survivors-of-boyhood-sexual-abuse-is-the-next-step-in-the-penn-state-case/)
The Rape of Men. NY Times opinion page letter, print edition, March 5, 2011, p. A20
Stepping out from the shadows: Senator Brown speaks about childhood sexual abuse. Psychology Today's Psychoanalysis 3.0 blog, selected by PT editors as Essential Reads in Child Development, Feb 20 ’11 (http://www.psychologytoday.com/blog/psychoanalysis-30/201102/stepping-out-the-shadows-senator-brown-speaks-about-childhood-sexual-a)
Talking about sexually abused boys, and the men they become. Psychology Today's Psychoanalysis 3.0 blog, selected by PT editors as Essential Reads in Child Development, Jan 30 ’11 (http://www.psychologytoday.com/blog/psychoanalysis-30/201101/talking-about-sexually-abused-boys-and-the-men-they-become)

References

External links 
Homepage

1940s births
Living people
21st-century American psychologists
20th-century American psychologists